The Tyler–Jacksonville combined statistical area is made up of two counties in East Texas. The statistical area consists of the Tyler metropolitan statistical area and the Jacksonville micropolitan statistical area. As of the 2000 census, the CSA had a population of 221,365 (though a July 1, 2009 estimate placed the population at 253,138).

Counties
Cherokee
Smith

Communities

Places with more than 100,000 people
Tyler (Principal City)

Places with 5,000 to 15,000 people
Jacksonville (Principal City)
Rusk
Whitehouse
Lindale

Places with 1,000 to 5,000 people
Alto
Bullard
Hideaway
Overton (partial)
Troup

Places with less than 1,000 people
Arp
Cuney
Gallatin
New Chapel Hill
New Summerfield
Noonday
Reklaw (partial)
Wells
Winona

Demographics
As of the census of 2000, there were 221,365 people, 82,343 households, and 59,009 families residing within the CSA. The racial makeup of the CSA was 72.97% White, 18.41% African American, 0.44% Native American, 0.64% Asian, 0.03% Pacific Islander, 6.10% from other races, and 1.41% from two or more races. Hispanic or Latino of any race were 11.61% of the population.

The median income for a household in the CSA was $33,231 and the median income for a family was $39,642. Males had a median income of $29,431 versus $21,070 for females. The per capita income for the CSA was $16,526.

See also
List of cities in Texas
Texas census statistical areas
List of Texas metropolitan areas

References

Geography of Smith County, Texas
Geography of Cherokee County, Texas
Combined statistical areas of the United States